The Fleur de Lys (or Lis) was a public house in French Row, St Albans, Hertfordshire, England. The building has an C18th brick facade, but it dates from the Middle Ages and is listed  grade II with Historic England.  The building was refurbished and renamed The Snug in 2007, to become part of the Snug bar chain.

References

External links

Pubs in St Albans
Grade II listed pubs in Hertfordshire